This is a list of Western Michigan Broncos football players in the NFL Draft.

Key

Selections

References

Western Michigan

Western Michigan Broncos NFL Draft